Mario Santibáñez (born 1 February 1950 in Mexico City) is a Mexican swimmer who competed in the 1968 Summer Olympics.

References

1950 births
Living people
Mexican male swimmers
Swimmers from Mexico City
Mexican male freestyle swimmers
Male butterfly swimmers
Olympic swimmers of Mexico
Swimmers at the 1968 Summer Olympics
Central American and Caribbean Games gold medalists for Mexico
Competitors at the 1970 Central American and Caribbean Games
Central American and Caribbean Games medalists in swimming
20th-century Mexican people